The following is a list of songs recorded by American rapper Snoop Dogg.

References

Snoop Dogg